Markus Hoffmann (2 January 1971 – 16 January 1997) was a German actor, most famous for his portrayal of Henning von Anstetten in the soap opera Verbotene Liebe.

Hoffmann committed suicide at the age of 26 by jumping from the 28th floor of a high-rise in Berlin-Neukölln.

External links 
 

1971 births
1997 deaths
Male actors from Berlin
German male soap opera actors
Suicides by jumping in Germany
20th-century German male actors
People from Neukölln
1997 suicides